Wellington is a city in the Central Western Slopes region of New South Wales, Australia, located at the junction of the Wambuul Macquarie and Bell Rivers. It is within the local government area of Dubbo Regional Council.

Wellington was the second European settlement west of the Blue Mountains, first established as a convict establishment in 1823.

History

Aboriginal history
The area now known as Wellington lies on the traditional lands of the Wiradjuri people.  

The 'Wambuul' (Macquarie River) was an important source of sustenance for this widespread Aboriginal group united by kinship and a common language. Surviving evidence in the Wellington area of the occupation by the Wiradjuri people prior to European contact includes rock shelters with archaeological deposits, a carved tree, scarred trees, open camp sites, grinding grooves sites and bora (ceremonial) grounds.

The city still has a strong Aboriginal presence, largely as a result of early missionary settlements set up there, other Aboriginal campsites, such as the Wellington Common, and, from 1910, the Nanima Aboriginal Reserve, all of which kept local people residing in the area. 

In 2007, a group of Wiradjuri people won a Native Title claim, over the area known as the Wellington Common, where many Wiradjuri lived, and that land was returned to its traditional owners.

European exploration
The European discovery of the Wellington Valley occurred during the return journey of John Oxley’s Lachlan River expedition in 1817.  While crossing from the Bogan River to the Macquarie River in August 1817 Oxley and his party happening upon the Wellington Valley with the Bell River running through it.  They followed the river to its junction with the Macquarie.  Oxley was effusive about the valley, describing it as “beautifully picturesque” and “studded with fine trees upon a soil which may be equalled, but can never be excelled”. The Bell River was named “as a compliment to Brevet Major Bell of the 48th Regiment” and the Wellington Valley was named after the Duke of Wellington.

Convict outpost

In January 1823 Lieutenant Percy Simpson was appointed by the colonial government to establish a settlement at the junction of the Bell and Macquarie rivers in the Wellington Valley.  Simpson and a party of soldiers and convicts arrived at the locality via Bathurst in February with 12 cows and 40 sheep, as well as a provision of wheat. Simpson chose a site for the settlement on high ground above the Bell River (about three kilometres south of the modern cityship).  There were early problems, including desertions and stock theft by convicts, but fields of wheat and other staples were eventually established. A muster roll in 1826 recorded 85 men at Wellington.  By that stage a number of pastoral runs had been established in the vicinity of the settlement and along the Macquarie River. The convict outpost at Wellington was discontinued in 1831 and "the settlement was used for a time as a Government stock station". A traveller to the area in 1832 described the settlement as “abandoned” except for “a dozen stockmen and soldiers who remained to protect the buildings from the mischievous spoilation of the natives”.

Missionary settlement

In December 1831 the Secretary of State for the Colonies informed Governor Bourke that an agreement had been entered into with the Church Missionary Society in England “by which the organisation had undertaken to send out and superintend a mission to the natives”.  Permission was sought to “establish the Mission at Wellington Valley”, to which the Governor agreed, authorising them to “occupy the Government buildings there and to use for grazing any land they desired to occupy for that purpose”. The missionaries sent to Wellington in 1832 were Rev. William Watson and Rev. James Handt, a Lutheran clergyman.

In 1835 Messrs. Backhouse and Walter, both Quakers, visited the Mission.  Backhouse reported that ”the blacks at the station were not numerous”, with “about 30” being the usual number living there. The Aborigines were said to be “very capricious” and “by no means desirous to learn”. They were “attracted” to the food supplied by the Mission and “they were not disposed to work”.  A mission report in 1836 stated that “the vocabulary of the native language had been revised and enlarged” and that “services were held in the language”. 
   
Rev. Handt left Wellington in 1836 “as his wife was ill”.  Rev. James Gunther and his wife arrived in August 1837, replacing Handt and his wife.

Wellington cityship

In 1840, a village called Montefiores was established on the north side of the Macquarie River crossing. The city of Wellington, on the south bank of the Macquarie River opposite Montefiores, was gazetted in 1846, and on 20 March 1885, Wellington was proclaimed a city.

The first local government body covering Wellington was the Wellington Municipal District, proclaimed in 1879. In 1950 it was amalgamated with Macquarie Shire and part of Cobbora Shire to form Wellington Shire. There was a number of transfer of areas with adjoining shires, and in 2016 Wellington Shire was amalgamated with the local government area of Dubbo City to form Western Plains Regional Council.

Wellington is the second oldest New South Wales settlement west of the Blue Mountains. One of its hotels, the Lion of Waterloo, established by Nicolas Hyeronimus in 1842, is the oldest operating west of the Blue Mountains.

Near to The Lion of Waterloo is the location of the last recorded duel fought on Australian soil, in 1854.  

As a regional centre Wellington benefited by the development of the gold mining industry in the district from the 1850s. Initially this was working alluvial deposits of gold but later focused on the mining of quartz reefs. Among the mining districts was Mitchells Creek located 8 miles to the north east near the locality of Bodangora. In the first decade of the 20th century, there was a revival of gold mining in the area, when gold dredges operated on the Macquarie River near Wellington.

The extension of the Main Western Railway from Orange to Wellington opened on 1 June 1880. The line was subsequently extended to Dubbo in February 1881.

Heritage listings
Wellington has a number of heritage-listed sites, including:
 9 Amaroo Drive: John Fowler 7nhp Steam Road Locomotive
 Curtis Street: Wellington Convict and Mission Site
 21 Maughan Street: Wellington Post Office
 University Road: Blacks Camp

Economy

Wellington is the centre of rich agricultural land. While alfalfa and vegetables are grown on lands on the river, wheat, wool, lambs and beef cattle are grown on surrounding pastures. The city acts as a commercial centre for the surrounding district.

In September 2008, the Wellington Correctional Centre was opened. A Probation and Parole Office was also opened in the centre of city. Wellington Council hopes this will stimulate economic growth in the area, due to increasing employment opportunities and the need for non-locals to utilise Wellington facilities.

The local newspaper The Wellington Times, a Rural Press title, is published three times a week with a circulation in the region of around 1000.

There is a popular Community Radio Station operating on a frequency of 91.5 MHz FM.

KFC was built in 2019.

Climate
Wellington has a subtropical climate (Cfa) with long, very hot summers and cool winters, and uniform rainfall throughout the year. The city is rather sunny, getting 138.1 clear days annually. In January, the average minimum temperature in the city is 16.9 °C and the average maximum is 32.9 °C, while in July the average minimum is 2.2 °C and the average maximum is 15.2 °C.

Transport links

Welington station is served by a daily NSW TrainLink XPT service which runs between Sydney and Dubbo.

The closest commercial airport is that of Dubbo. QantasLink and Regional Express service the airport three-five times daily from Sydney. A small airport (Bondangora Airport) for private planes exists twelve kilometres east of Wellington.

Ogden's Coaches operates return services to Dubbo, with one extending to Narromine as a through-routed service with the Narromine link.

Nearby attractions

Lake Burrendong, a man-made lake, is located 30 kilometres south of the city. Its capacity is three and a half times that of Sydney Harbour and supplies water for irrigation schemes downstream. It is also a popular location for anglers, sailors and water skiers. Burrendong Arboretum is a sanctuary for endangered Australian flora and covers 1.60 km².

The nearby Wellington Caves feature the Cathedral Cave with the massive Altar Rock and has a viewable underground river running at the bottom. Immediately to the East of the cityship lies the Catombal Range with magnificent bushwalks in and around Mt Arthur and Mt Wellesley.

The Wellington Boot, a country racing festival is held in March and April annually. The Bell River Wine Estate is nearby.

Notable residents 
 Ben Austin – Paralympian, grew up in Wellington
 Millicent Bryant – first woman in Australia to earn a pilot licence, born at Apsley, Wellington.
 Max Cullen – actor
 Silvanus Daniel – politician
 Terry Fahey – former professional rugby league footballer for South Sydney Rabbitohs, Eastern Suburbs and Canberra Raiders
 Blake Ferguson –  Former NRL player
 Nicolas Hyeronimus – pioneering innkeeper, merchant, pastoralist and inaugural MLA for Wellington
 Media stars John Laws, Laurie Oakes and Ray Martin all lived in Wellington
 Colleen McCullough – author, born in Wellington
 Brent Naden – NRL Player, born in Wellington
 Ian O'Brien – Olympic gold medalist in the 200 m breaststroke at the 1964 Summer Olympics, grew up in Wellington
 Tyrone Peachey – NRL player. 
 Trent Runciman – Former NRL player
 Paul Shaw – former professional rugby league player for Manly Sea Eagles and Gold Coast Seagulls
 Kotoni Staggs – NRL player for the Brisbane Broncos
 Tim Storrier – Award winning artist.

References

External links

 About Wellington and District
VisitNSW.com - Wellington

 
Towns in New South Wales
Towns in the Central West (New South Wales)
Dubbo Regional Council
Mining towns in New South Wales